Liao Yu-cheng (born 4 September 1980 in Taoyuan County (now Taoyuan City), Taiwan) is a former Taiwanese professional baseball player who played for the Brother Elephants of Chinese Professional Baseball League.

Liao was a submarine pitcher and was given the nickname  Golden Submarine due to Brother Elephant's yellow uniform.

Early life
In senior high school Liao was originally an outfielder until the team's pitching coach noticed him throw a 93 mph fastball and encouraged him to become a pitcher.

In the 2004 CPBL Draft, La New Bears and Macoto Cobras noticed Liao pitch up to 88 mph with a sidearm delivery and both teams welcomed Liao to enter the Draft. With no other teams attentions, Brother Elephants picked up Liao in the first round of draft.

Professional career
In his first career season, Liao pitched only one game: three innings earning two runs.  The Elephants were ready to release Liao; and the Bears were ready to claim him however the 2005 manager convinced the team to keep Liao; he thought that Liao could be an excellent pitcher and just needed a chance.

In the 2006 season, the pitching coach made Liao a starting pitcher.

On May 10, 2007 Liao got his first career win in CPBL.

In the 2008 CPBL season, he gained the ERA Championship Award and the Most Progressive Award. Liao later participated in the 2009 World Baseball Classic and showed up in the Round 1 Pool A match between Chinese Taipei and South Korea, the eventual runner-up. He was allowed one point in his 3-inning pitching and his performance was praised by South Korean manager Kim In-Sik.

After the 2009 Taiwan Series Liao came under investigation for game fixing allegations. On January 6, 2010, Liao confessed to the Banciao District Prosecutors' Office that in 2007 when he was a minor player with only NT$55,000 (ca. USD$1,700) monthly salary, he accepted NT$600,000 (ca. USD$18,500) from gamblers and pitched one game for them. Liao also insisted that it was his only game-fixing activity throughout his career and because he later felt deeply uneasy for it, he donated NT$300,000 to local charitable organizations. As a result, Liao was expelled by the Brother Elephants, ending his short baseball career.

As of September 2010, Liao coaches in a club baseball team in his hometown of Taoyuan County.

Career statistics

References

External links
 

1980 births
Living people
Baseball pitchers
Baseball players from Taoyuan City
Brother Elephants players
2009 World Baseball Classic players
Match fixers
Taiwanese criminals
Sportspeople convicted of crimes